Sir Archibald Richard James Southby, 1st Baronet  (8 July 1886 – 30 October 1969) was an English Royal Navy officer and Conservative Party politician.

Career

Royal Navy 
Southby joined the Royal Navy, and on 15 September 1902 was posted as a naval cadet to the pre-dreadnought battleship HMS Magnificent, flagship to the second-in-command of the Channel Fleet. The following month it was reported that he would be lent to the armoured cruiser HMS Hogue which was in the last stages of completion before her first commission in November.

In 1908 and 1909 he commanded torpedo boats. In the period following the First World War, he took part in the demilitarisation of Heligoland.

Member of Parliament 
After his return home to England, he was elected as Member of Parliament (MP) for the Epsom constituency in Surrey at a by-election in 1928.

Norway Debate 

He spoke in the Norway Debate in the House of Commons. Southby spoke immediately after Leo Amery. Amery's famous speech against the government of Neville Chamberlain closed with words, "Depart, I say, and let us have done with you. In the name of God, go". Southby rose at 8.44pm and spoke in defence of the government -

Buchenwald 
Southby travelled as part of the British parliamentary delegation to the Buchenwald Concentration Camp in April 1945. He described the journey as one, "which I felt it was my duty to undertake and which I shall never regret". However, the journey brought on an illness which was "a most unpleasant mixture of influenza and near jaundice".

Later parliamentary career 
He held the seat for nearly 20 years until his resignation in 1947 by the procedural device of accepting the Stewardship of the Chiltern Hundreds.  He was made a Baronet in 1937, of Burford in the county of Oxfordshire.

Family
Southby was twice married: firstly to Phyllis Mary Garton, on 20 July 1909, from whom he was divorced in 1962. They had two sons, Sir Archibald Richard Charles Southby, 2nd Bt, and Lt.-Cdr. Patrick Southby (born 1913). He married secondly to Noreen Vera Simm, on 28 March 1962.

Arms

Notes

References

External links 
 

1886 births
1969 deaths
Conservative Party (UK) MPs for English constituencies
Southby, Sir Archibald Southby, 1st Baronet
Deputy Lieutenants of Surrey
UK MPs 1924–1929
UK MPs 1929–1931
UK MPs 1931–1935
UK MPs 1935–1945
UK MPs 1945–1950
Lord High Treasurers
Royal Navy officers